Chax may refer to:

A Great Marquis of Hell, also spelled Shax
A line of Japanese products designed by Mori Chack
A free, third-party add-on for iChat